The SL postcode area, also known as the Slough postcode area, is a group of ten postcode districts in South East England, within eight post towns. These cover east Berkshire (including Slough, Maidenhead, Windsor and Ascot) and south Buckinghamshire (including Iver, Gerrards Cross, Marlow and Bourne End), plus a very small part of south-west Hertfordshire.

Mail for this area is sorted in Greenford (Green Park Way).



Coverage
The approximate coverage of the postcode districts:

|-
! SL0
| IVER
| Iver, Iver Heath, Richings Park, Thorney
| Buckinghamshire
|-
! SL1
| SLOUGH
| Slough, Burnham, Cippenham, Farnham Royal, Stoke Poges, Littleworth, Farnham Common
| Slough, Buckinghamshire
|-
! SL2
| SLOUGH
| Britwell, Farnham Common, Farnham Royal, Stoke Poges, Egypt, Hedgerley
| Slough, Buckinghamshire
|-
! SL3
| SLOUGH
| Langley, Datchet, Colnbrook, Poyle, Horton, Fulmer, George Green, Wexham, part of Richings Park
| Slough, Buckinghamshire, Windsor and Maidenhead
|-
! SL4
| WINDSOR
| Windsor, Old Windsor, Eton, Eton Wick, Clewer, Dedworth, Cranbourne, Winkfield, Dorney, Spital, Oakley Green, Woodside, Boveney, Fifield (east)
| Windsor and Maidenhead, Bracknell Forest, Buckinghamshire, Slough
|-
! SL5
| ASCOT
| Ascot, Sunninghill, Sunningdale, North Ascot, South Ascot, Burleigh, Cheapside
| Windsor and Maidenhead, Bracknell Forest
|-
! SL6
| MAIDENHEAD
| Maidenhead, Taplow, parts of Cippenham Slough, Bray, Braywick, Cookham, Cookham Dean, Cookham Rise, White Waltham, Hurley, Hurley Bottom, Holyport, Pinkneys Green, Woodlands Park, Furze Platt, Hitcham, Littlewick Green, Burchett's Green, Paley Street, Stud Green, Touchen End, Fifield (west)
| Windsor and Maidenhead, Buckinghamshire
|-
! SL7
| MARLOW
| Marlow, Marlow Bottom, Little Marlow, Medmenham, Bisham, Lower Woodend 
| Buckinghamshire, Windsor and Maidenhead
|-
! SL8
| BOURNE END
| Bourne End, Well End
| Buckinghamshire
|-
! SL9
| GERRARDS CROSS
| Gerrards Cross, Chalfont St Peter, Chalfont Common, Horn Hill, Tatling End (west)
| Buckinghamshire, Three Rivers 
|-
! style="background:#FFFFFF;"|SL60
| style="background:#FFFFFF;"|SLOUGH
| style="background:#FFFFFF;"|Jobcentre Plus
| style="background:#FFFFFF;"|non-geographic
|-
! style="background:#FFFFFF;"|SL95
| style="background:#FFFFFF;"|SLOUGH
| style="background:#FFFFFF;"|Royal Mail
| style="background:#FFFFFF;"|non-geographic''
|}

WM postcode area
In 2008, a group of residents in the Royal Borough of Windsor and Maidenhead campaigned to have Windsor and Maidenhead's SL postcodes replaced with WM postcodes, claiming the association with Slough affected the towns' statuses as "desirable places to live". Royal Mail later stated that the campaign would be unlikely to succeed.

Map

See also
Postcode Address File
List of postcode areas in the United Kingdom

References

External links
Royal Mail's Postcode Address File
A quick introduction to Royal Mail's Postcode Address File (PAF)

Slough
Postcode areas covering South East England